The Reichenbachfall Funicular (RfB) is a funicular in the Bernese Oberland region of the Swiss canton of Berne. It links Willigen, near Meiringen, with the uppermost of the Reichenbach Falls, famous as the site of the apparent death of Sir Arthur Conan Doyle's fictional hero, Sherlock Holmes. On its route the line follows and crosses the lower falls of the Reichenbach.

The funicular was opened in 1899, and was rebuilt in 1999 to the original design. Between 1912 and 1956, it was linked to Meiringen by the Meiringen–Reichenbach–Aareschlucht tramway. Today it is owned by the EWR Energie company, which operates the adjacent hydroelectric power plant, but is maintained by the neighbouring Kraftwerke Oberhasli company, which also operates several other lines in the area. It has the following parameters:

The funicular operates only between May and mid-October. During this period it operates every 15 minutes from 09:00 to 17:00. The lower station is some 20 minutes walk, or a 6-minute bus ride, from Meiringen station on the Brünig railway line.

Gallery

References

External links 

Reichenbachfall Bahn page from Funimag
Reichenbachfall-Bahn page on Grimselwelt web site

Funicular railways in Switzerland
Bernese Oberland
Oberhasli
Metre gauge railways in Switzerland
Transport in the canton of Bern
Railway lines opened in 1899
1899 establishments in Switzerland
Heritage railways in Switzerland